Bottletop or Bottle Tops or variation, may refer to:

 Bottle top or bottle cap
 The Bottletop Band, a supergroup
 Bottle Tops, an accessory for capping opened aluminum cans
 Pogs or bottletops, a game using bottle cap tops

See also

 
 
 
 
 Bottle (disambiguation)
 Top (disambiguation)

Disambiguation pages